Bob Hansson (born 1970 in Helsingborg) is a Swedish poet and author. Hansson has written nine poetry books, the made his debut in 1998 with the book "Heja Världen", after that he released another three poetry books. A poetic, an interview book "Kärleken Hur fan gör man", and four novels.

In 2010, Hansson received the SRs stora novellpris an award. The same year he was named by ALIS at Yttrandefrihetens hjälte (the free speech hero). Hansson won the Swedish championship in Poetry slam in 1995 in Falkenberg.

Bibliography 
Det sista vi har är våra kroppar (Ordfront, 2012)
Dingo Dingo – Den manliga frigörelsen (2011)
Vips så blev det liv (Ordfront, 2010)
Cross Water – Möten med broar (Andina Förlag, 2009) by Ewa K Andinsson 
Kärlek, hur fan gör man? (Wahlström & Widstrand, 2008)
Gunnar (Wahlström & Widstrand, 2007) 
Halleluja liksom (Wahlström & Widstrand, 2005) 
Här är vi (Ruin, 2004) 
Bräcklighetens poetik (Wahlström & Widstrand, 2003) 
Här ligger jag och duger (Wahlström & Widstrand, 2001) 
Kom över på den här sidan: dikt för dig som föredrar livet (Bromberg, 2000) 
Lugna puckarnas Mosebok (Wahlström & Widstrand, 2000) 
Heja världen!: dikter i urdur (Wahlström & Widstrand, 1998) 
Grupp 94 (antologi, first publish poems) (Gedins förlag 1994)

Discography 
Kör solen kör (National 2003)
Stålmannen är död (Highspeedart 2005)
Heja världen (Bolero/Sony 2008)

References

Living people
1970 births
20th-century Swedish poets
Swedish male poets
People from Helsingborg
Swedish-language poets
21st-century Swedish poets
20th-century Swedish male writers
21st-century male writers